The thirty-first season of Dancing with the Stars premiered on Disney+ on September 19, 2022, and concluded on November 21, 2022. This season marked the first live competition show to air on the streaming platform. Tyra Banks returned as host, while season 19 champion Alfonso Ribeiro joined as co-host.

Social media personality Charli D'Amelio and Mark Ballas were crowned the champions, while The Bachelorette star Gabby Windey and Val Chmerkovskiy finished in second place, comedian Wayne Brady and Witney Carson finished in third place, and drag queen Shangela and Gleb Savchenko finished in fourth.

This marked the last season for host Tyra Banks.

Cast

Couples 
On August 25, 2022, it was reported that Charli D'Amelio and her mother Heidi D'Amelio would be competing as celebrity participants. Soon after, Joseph Baena, Wayne Brady, Daniel Durant, Jordin Sparks, Gabby Windey, and Trevor Donovan were all reported to be celebrity participants. Charli and Heidi D'Amelio were officially announced as part of the season's cast on September 7, with the full roster of celebrity participants and their partnerships officially revealed on Good Morning America the following day. With 16 couples participating, this season is tied with season nine for the largest cast in the show's history.

A promo for the season released on August 18 features professional dancers Daniella Karagach, Pasha Pashkov, Artem Chigvintsev, Witney Carson, Brandon Armstrong, and Cheryl Burke. Britt Stewart, Peta Murgatroyd, Emma Slater, Koko Iwasaki, Val Chmerkovskiy, Alan Bersten, Gleb Savchenko, and Louis Van Amstel were later revealed to be the rest of the professional dancers for the season. Mark Ballas was announced as a pro on September 8. Sasha Farber was originally going to be in the troupe this season, but was later revealed to also be returning as a pro. Sharna Burgess was originally set to be a professional dancer, but on August 31, she announced she dropped out of the lineup. Jenna Johnson and Lindsay Arnold are both sitting the season out, due to Johnson expecting her first child and Arnold wanting to spend time with her family respectively. Murgatroyd returns to the pro lineup after taking the previous season off. Iwasaki, who was the runner-up on season 14 of So You Think You Can Dance and performed as part of the Dancing with the Stars Live! – 2022 Tour, joins the show as a first-time pro. Van Amstel and Ballas both return to the show after hiatuses.

On September 26, 2022, it was announced that Daniella Karagach had tested positive for COVID-19 and would miss that night's performance. Alexis Warr replaced her as Joseph Baena's dance partner for two weeks. On October 28, 2022, it was announced that Val Chmerkovskiy had tested positive for COVID-19 and would miss the October 31 episode. Alan Bersten took over for him as Gabby Windey's dance partner for the episode.

On November 20, 2022, professional dancer Cheryl Burke announced her retirement from the show after 26 seasons.

Host and judges
On July 14, 2022, it was announced that Tyra Banks would return as host, with Len Goodman, Derek Hough, Carrie Ann Inaba, and Bruno Tonioli returning as judges. Additionally, it was announced that season nineteen champion Alfonso Ribeiro would be joining the show alongside Banks as co-host. In May 2022, judge Tonioli revealed that he would be quitting British series Strictly Come Dancing. A judge since Strictlys first season in 2004, he cited an 'unsustainable' situation (due to traveling back-and-forth for each show) as his reason for leaving. On October 24, Michael Bublé served as a guest judge.

During the semifinals, Goodman announced that this would be his final season as a judge.

Dance troupe 
The dance troupe returned for season 31, for the first time since season 27, and consisted of returning pro Ezra Sosa and new pros Kateryna Klishyna, Alexis Warr, and D'Angelo Castro.

Scoring charts 

Notes

 : The couples were scored on a 50-point scale due to the presence of a guest judge.
 : This was the lowest score of the week.
 : This was the highest score of the week.
 :  This couple finished in first place.
 :  This couple finished in second place.
 :  This couple finished in third place.
 :  This couple finished in fourth place.
 :  This couple was in the bottom two or three, but was not eliminated.
 :  This couple was eliminated.
 :  This couple withdrew from the competition.

Highest and lowest scoring performances
The best and worst performances in each dance according to the judges' 40-point scale are as follows. Scores from guest judges are not included.

Couples' highest and lowest scoring dances
Scores are based upon a potential 40-point maximum. Scores from guest judges are not included.

Weekly scores
Individual judges' scores in the charts below (given in parentheses) are listed in this order from left to right: Carrie Ann Inaba, Len Goodman, Derek Hough, Bruno Tonioli.

Week 1: Premiere Night Party
Each couple danced the cha-cha-cha, foxtrot, jive, quickstep, salsa, tango, or Viennese waltz to their favorite party song. Couples are listed in the order they performed.

Judges' votes to save
Carrie Ann: Teresa & Pasha
Derek: Teresa & Pasha
Bruno: Teresa & Pasha
Len: Did not vote, but would have voted to save Teresa & Pasha

Week 2: Elvis Night

Each couple performed one unlearned dance to a song by Elvis Presley. The rumba was introduced. Couples are listed in the order they performed. 

Daniella Karagach tested positive for COVID-19, so Joseph Baena performed with Alexis Warr instead.

Judges' votes to save
Derek: Teresa & Pasha
Bruno: Teresa & Pasha
Carrie Ann: Cheryl & Louis
Len: Cheryl & Louis (Since the other judges were not unanimous, Len, as head judge, made the final decision to save Cheryl & Louis.)

Week 3: 60 Years of James Bond
Each couple performed one unlearned dance to a song from a James Bond film. The Argentine tango and samba were introduced. Couples are listed in the order they performed. 

Joseph Baena again performed with Alexis Warr, due to Daniella Karagach recovering from COVID-19.

Judges' votes to save
Bruno: Sam & Cheryl 
Carrie Ann: Sam & Cheryl
Derek: Sam & Cheryl
Len: Did not vote, but would have voted to save Sam & Cheryl

Week 4: Disney+ Night
Each couple performed one unlearned dance to a song from a film or television series featured on Disney+. The Charleston, jazz and the paso doble were introduced. Couples are listed in the order they performed.

Jenifer Lewis performed "Dig a Little Deeper" live for Shangela's Charleston. The dance troupe and pros also did routines to "Colombia, Mi Encanto" from Encanto, "That's How You Know" from Enchanted and "Try Everything" from Zootopia.

Judges' votes to save
Carrie Ann: Trevor & Emma
Bruno: Trevor & Emma
Derek: Trevor & Emma
Len: Did not vote, but would have voted to save Trevor & Emma

Week 5: Stars' Stories Week
Night 1 - Most Memorable Year
Each couple performed one unlearned dance to celebrate the most memorable year of their lives. Contemporary and the waltz were introduced. Couples are listed in the order they performed.

Selma Blair announced that she had to withdraw from the competition for medical reasons, although she and Sasha Farber still performed their waltz. As a result, no one else was eliminated at the end of the night.

Night 2 - Prom Night
Each couple performed one unlearned dance recalling their high school prom nights, and a dance marathon to the hustle and the Lindy Hop for bonus points. Couples are listed in the order they performed.

Due to Selma Blair's withdrawal, the judges scores and viewer votes from night one and night two were combined.

Judges' votes to save
Derek: Heidi & Artem
Carrie Ann: Joseph & Daniella
Bruno: Heidi & Artem
Len: Heidi & Artem (Since the other judges were not unanimous, Len, as head judge, made the final decision to save Heidi & Artem.)

Week 6: Michael Bublé Night
Individual judges' scores are given in this order from left to right: Carrie Ann Inaba, Len Goodman, Michael Bublé, Derek Hough, Bruno Tonioli.

Each couple performed one dance to a song by Michael Bublé. Couples are listed in the order they performed. 

Bublé was a guest judge and performed "Sway" with the dance troupe, and "Higher" with judge Derek Hough and his fiancée, Hayley Erbert, along with the pros.

Judges' votes to save
Bruno: Trevor & Emma
Derek: Jessie & Alan
Carrie Ann: Trevor & Emma
Len: Trevor & Emma (Since the other judges were not unanimous, Len, as head judge, made the final decision to save Trevor & Emma.)

Week 7: Halloween Night
Each couple performed one unlearned dance and participated in a team dance to Halloween themes. Couples are listed in the order they performed.

Val Chmerkovskiy tested positive for COVID-19, so Gabby Windey performed with Alan Bersten instead.

Judges' votes to save
Carrie Ann: Heidi & Artem
Derek: Jordin & Brandon
Bruno: Jordin & Brandon
Len: Heidi & Artem (Since the other judges were not unanimous, Len, as head judge, made the final decision to save Heidi & Artem.)

Week 8: '90s Night
Each couple performed one unlearned dance and a dance relay to songs from the 1990s. Couples are listed in the order they performed. Two couples were sent home at the end of the night in a double elimination.

Vanilla Ice, En Vogue, Salt-N-Pepa, and Kid 'n Play performed their respective songs during the dance relays.

Salt-N-Pepa and En Vogue opened the show with a performance of "Whatta Man". The dance troupe did routines to "Spiderwebs" by No Doubt, "Blue (Da Ba Dee)" by Eiffel 65, "What's My Age Again?" by blink-182, and "U Can't Touch This" by MC Hammer.

This episode was dedicated to the memory of season nine contestant Aaron Carter, who had passed away two days prior.

Notes

Judges' votes to save

Derek: Trevor & Emma
Bruno: Trevor & Emma
Carrie Ann: Trevor & Emma
Len: Did not vote, but would have voted to save Trevor & Emma

Week 9: Semifinals
Each couple performed one unlearned ballroom dance and one unlearned Latin dance. Couples are listed in the order they performed. Two couples were eliminated at the end of the night in a double elimination.

Len Goodman announced that he would be retiring from the series at the end of this season.

The dance troupe performed to "Beautiful Day" by U2.

Judges' votes to save
Carrie Ann: Shangela & Gleb
Derek: Shangela & Gleb
Bruno: Shangela & Gleb
Len: Did not vote, but would have voted to save Shangela & Gleb

Week 10: Finals
Each couple performed one redemption dance coached by one of the judges, and one freestyle dance. Couples are listed in the order they performed their first dance.

Dance chart 
The celebrities and professional partners danced one of these routines for each corresponding week:
 Week 1 (Premiere Night Party): One unlearned dance
 Week 2 (Elvis Night): One unlearned dance
 Week 3 (60 Years of James Bond): One unlearned dance
 Week 4 (Disney+ Night): One unlearned dance
 Week 5 (Stars' Stories Week, Night 1, Most Memorable Year): One unlearned dance
 Week 5 (Stars' Stories Week, Night 2, Prom Night): One unlearned dance & dance marathon
 Week 6 (Michael Bublé Night): One unlearned dance 
 Week 7 (Halloween Night): One unlearned dance & team dance
 Week 8 ('90s Night): One unlearned dance & dance relay
 Week 9 (Semifinals): One unlearned ballroom dance & one unlearned Latin dance
 Week 10 (Finale): Redemption dance & freestyle

Notes

 :  This was the highest scoring dance of the week.
 :  This was the lowest scoring dance of the week.
 :  This dance was not scored.

References

2022 American television seasons
Dancing with the Stars (American TV series)